A fire whirl or fire devil (sometimes referred to as a fire tornado) is a whirlwind induced by a fire and often (at least partially) composed of flame or ash. These start with a whirl of wind, often made visible by smoke, and may occur when intense rising heat and turbulent wind conditions combine to form whirling eddies of air. These eddies can contract a tornado-like vortex that sucks in debris and combustible gases.

The phenomenon is sometimes labeled a fire tornado, firenado, fire swirl, or fire twister, but these terms usually refer to a separate phenomenon where a fire has such intensity that it generates an actual tornado. Fire whirls are not usually classifiable as tornadoes as the vortex in most cases does not extend from the surface to cloud base. Also, even in such cases, those fire whirls very rarely are classic tornadoes, as their vorticity derives from surface winds and heat-induced lifting, rather than from a tornadic mesocyclone aloft. 

The phenomenon was first verified in the 2003 Canberra bushfires and has since been verified in the 2018 Carr Fire in California and 2020 Loyalton Fire in California and Nevada.

Formation
A fire whirl consists of a burning core and a rotating pocket of air. Fire whirls become frequent when a wildfire, or especially firestorm, creates its own wind, which can spawn large vortices. Even bonfires often have whirls on a smaller scale and tiny fire whirls have been generated by very small fires in laboratories.

Most of the largest fire whirls are spawned from wildfires. They form when a warm updraft and convergence from the wildfire are present.

These can also aid the 'spotting' ability of wildfires to propagate and start new fires as they lift burning materials such as tree bark. These burning embers can be blown away from the fire-ground by the stronger winds aloft.

Fire whirls can be common within the vicinity of a plume during a volcanic eruption. These range from small to large and form from a variety of mechanisms, including those akin to typical fire whirl processes, but can result in Cumulonimbus flammagenitus (cloud) spawning landspouts and waterspouts or even to develop mesocyclone-like updraft rotation of the plume itself and/or of the cumulonimbi, which can spawn tornadoes similar to those in supercells. Pyrocumulonimbi generated by large fires on rare occasion also develops in a similar way.

Classification
There are currently three widely recognized types of fire whirls: 

 Type 1: Stable and centered over burning area.
 Type 2: Stable or transient, downwind of burning area.
 Type 3: Steady or transient, centered over an open area adjacent to an asymmetric burning area with wind.

There is evidence suggesting that the fire whirl in the Hifukusho-ato area, during the 1923 Great Kantō earthquake, was of type 3. Other mechanism and fire whirl dynamics may exist. A broader classification of fire whirls suggested by Forman A. Williams includes five different categories:

Whirls generated by fuel distribution in wind
Whirls above fuels in pools or on water
Tilted fire whirls
Moving fire whirls
Whirls modified by vortex breakdown

The meteorological community views some fire-induced phenomena as atmospheric phenomena. Using the pyro- prefix, fire-induced clouds are called pyrocumulus and pyrocumulonimbus. Larger fire vortices are similarly being viewed. Based on vortex scale, the classification terms of pyronado, "pyrotornado", and "pyromesocyclone" have been proposed.

Notable examples

During the 1871 Peshtigo fire, the community of Williamsonville, Wisconsin, was burned by a fire whirl; the area where Williamsonville once stood is now Tornado Memorial County Park.

An extreme example of a fire whirl is the 1923 Great Kantō earthquake in Japan, which ignited a large city-sized firestorm which in turn produced a gigantic fire whirl that killed 38,000 people in fifteen minutes in the Hifukusho-Ato region of Tokyo.

Numerous large fire whirls (some tornadic) that developed after lightning struck an oil storage facility near San Luis Obispo, California, on 7 April 1926, produced significant structural damage well away from the fire, killing two.

Fire whirls were produced in the conflagrations and firestorms triggered by firebombings of European and Japanese cities during World War II and by the atomic bombings of Hiroshima and Nagasaki. Fire whirls associated with the bombing of Hamburg, particularly those of 27–28 July 1943, were studied.

Throughout the 1960s and 1970s, particularly in 1978–1979, fire whirls ranging from the transient and very small to intense, long-lived tornado-like vortices capable of causing significant damage were spawned by fires generated from the 1000 MW Météotron, a series of large oil wells located in the Lannemezan plain of France used for testing atmospheric motions and thermodynamics.

During the 2003 Canberra bushfires in Canberra, Australia, a violent fire whirl was documented. It was the first known fire whirl in Australia to have EF3 wind speeds on the Enhanced Fujita scale.

A fire whirl, of reportedly uncommon size for New Zealand wildfires, formed on day three of the 2017 Port Hills fires in Christchurch.

Residents in the city of Redding, California, while evacuating the area from the massive Carr Fire in late July 2018, reported seeing pyrocumulonimbus clouds and tornado-like behaviour from the firestorm, resulting in uprooted trees, cars, structures and other wind related damages in addition to the fire itself.

On August 15, 2020, for the first time in its history, the U.S. National Weather Service issued a tornado warning for a pyrocumulonimbus created by a wildfire near Loyalton, California, capable of producing a fire tornado.

Blue whirl
In controlled small-scale experiments, fire whirls are found to transition to a mode of combustion called blue whirls. The name blue whirl was coined because the soot production is negligible, leading to the disappearance of the yellow color typical of a fire whirl. Blue whirls are partially premixed flames that reside elevated in the recirculation region of the vortex-breakdown bubble. The flame length and burning rate of a blue whirl are smaller than those of a fire whirl.

See also

 Dust devil
 Steam devil
 Waterspout

References

Further reading

External links

 photo fire whirl outback Australia
 
 Fire tornado video (whirl) 11 September 2012 Alice Springs Australia
 Photo
 www.abc.net.au/news Australian researchers document world-first fire tornado (Canberra). And https://www.theregister.co.uk/2012/11/21/australian_fire_tornado/
 2013 'Fire Tornado' video. Canberra 2003 groundtrack, lee side spread, weather. 11:08 
 Catalyst story: Fire Tornado
 Another photo
 www.youtube.com Video of a Fire whirl (0:30), Brazil.
 
 Video of a Fire Tornado in San Diego country
 Fire Whirl Simulations
 1923 Great Kanto Earthquake - Fire Tornado | Video  - Check123

Wildfires
Severe weather and convection
Weather hazards
Wind
Vortices
Types of fire

fr:Tourbillon de feu